Coordination of Islamic Colleges (CIC), based in Kerala, India, is an Islamic university serving as an academic administrative body. Colleges affiliated with the C. I. C. offer "Wafy" courses for men and "Wafiyya" for women, which combine both Islamic and secular higher education (after the Secondary School, leading to a state-recognised university degree). These courses were designed and developed by Abdul Hakeem Faizy, an Islamic scholar and educationalist, who currently serves as the General Secretary of the C. I. C. and is an executive board member from India at the League of Islamic Universities based in Cairo. Panakkad Sayyid Sadiq Ali Shihab Thangal is the current President of the C. I. C. At present, there are around 100 institutes affiliated to the C. I. C in Kerala.

The C. I. C. was established in Malappuram District in 2000  and is associated with the Samastha Kerala Jem-iyyathul Ulama, principal Sunni-Shafi'i scholarly council, in Kerala.

The body had signed memoranda of understandings (MoU) with University of Cairo, League of Islamic Universities, Cairo, Arab League Educational, Cultural and Scientific Organisation, Academy of Arabic Language, Cairo and Ministry of Religious Affairs, Egypt. The body notably promotes the concept of women-only educational institutes of higher religious learning in Kerala, where women are simultaneously trained in advanced Islamic theology and modern secular education up to the graduate level.

History 
The CIC made a humble beginning in the year 2000 as an academic coordinating committee of a few Islamic colleges following a standardized curriculum and academic programmes. A precursor of this journey had started in mid 1990s at K.K.H.M. Islamic and Arts College, under Markazu Tharbiyathil Islamiyya, in Karthala of Malappuram District. Later, the CIC came into existence as an academic confederation of the various colleges who had shown interest in this programme and courses of study. The coordination has grown exponentially over a short span of time and became an academic umbrella of 90 colleges.

Registered as an autonomous organization under the Societies Registration Act XXI of 1860 (Regi. No: 379/04), the CIC has grown to become a multi-layered organisation, with a senate, a syndicate, an advisory board and various sub-committees such as Academic Council, Examination Board and finance committee, directives of which are binding on each affiliated college. At present, Wafiyya Campus, Pang is the headquarters of the CIC.

The CIC currently implements two courses called Wafy and Wafiyya, for boys and girls respectively, at its affiliated colleges. The names of the courses were derived from the Arabic stem ‘Wafa’, and its derivative ‘Awfa’ as used in the Quranic verse: “…..and anyone who fulfils what he has covenanted with Allah, Allah will soon grand him a great reward” (Fatah).Wafy is an eight-year programme in Islamic studies (comprising two-year preparatory, four-year undergraduate and two-year postgraduate courses) coupled with a recognized University degree in any secular discipline. Wafiyya is a five-year course in Islamic studies (comprising two-year preparatory and three-year undergraduate courses) coupled with a recognized University degree in any secular discipline. Both the courses were tailored to mould a new and promising generation of Islamic scholars with in-depth knowledge both in Islamic studies and secular discipline.

Wafy is a modified and upgraded version of Al Muthavval course, a part of the erstwhile Nizamiyya Syllabus which had been adopted by most of the traditional Islamic colleges and seminaries in India for centuries. While retaining the spirit of the traditional syllabus intact, modification was achieved by introducing new topics and updating some traditional subjects. These measures were introduced to meet the new challenges and needs of time.

Vision and Mission 
In-depth teaching of Islamic faith.
Achieving closer integration of different paradigms of knowledge and streams of wisdom by wedding classical Islamic studies with contemporary sciences.
To enable the Muslims to learn and internalise knowledge from a broad Islamic intellectual perspective.
Standardizing and revising the curricula of Islamic studies, in tune with the contemporary educational methodology and international best practices.
Promoting the beauty of Islamic thought and propagating the peaceful message of Islam by funnelling competent religious resource people in all spheres of the public life.
Raising the stature of religious culture and of religious resource people, in addition to bridging the sacred- scientific divide among the intellectuals, resulted from a watertight segregation of religious and scientific ethos.
Promoting peaceful coexistence of various religions and societies.
Raising the new generation in an Islamic environment.
Enhancing the educational, social and intellectual status of Muslim women.
Engaging in a broad spectrum of civic, humanitarian and environmental activities, cutting across religious, racial and linguistic divide.

Campuses

Wafa Campus 
The C. I. C. is currently headquartered at the 'Wafa Campus' at Pang in Malappuram District.

Post Graduate Campuses 
C. I. C. operates two Post Graduate campuses, the Wafy Post Graduate campus at Kalikavu in Malappuram District and Malik Deenar Wafy Post Graduate Campus at Thiruvallur in Kozhikkode District.

The Wafy Post Graduate Campus in Kalikavu launched its first phase in 2016 by opening the academic block.

Agreements 

The CIC has entered into academic and cultural collaboration, and signed Memorandum of Understandings(MoU) to this effect, with several globally renowned institutions such as<ref:
Al Azhar University, Cairo
University of Cairo
Arab League Educational, Cultural and Scientific Organization (ALECSO)
Islamic World Educational, Scientific and Cultural Organization (ICESCO)
Aligarh Muslim University, New Delhi, India
Hamdard University, India
Academy of Arabic Language, Cairo
Ministry of Religious Affairs, Egypt
National Council for Promotion of Urdu Language (NCPUL) of the Central Government of India

Recognitions 
The CIC has been recognized / honoured with:
Membership at the executive committee of the League of Islamic Universities (Cairo)
ISO 9001: 2015 certification
Membership at the General Secretariat of the World Muslim Communities Council (Abu Dhabi, United Arab Emirates)
Membership at the Board of Directors of the International Association of the Institutions Teaching Arabic Language for Non – Arabic Speakers (Islamic Educational, Scientific and Cultural Organisation-Morocco)
Islamonline International education Award (2009)
Islam.net Award (2011)

Governance & Coordination 

 President -  Sayyid Sadiq Ali Shihab Thangal 
 General Secretary - Abdul Hakeem Faizy 
Treasurer - Ali Faizy Thootha
 Vice Presidents
 K. A. Rahman Faizy Kavanur
 Muhammed Musliyar Chelakkad
 Ahmed Mulsiyar Maniyoor
 Hamza Musliyar Wayanad

Wafy and Wafiyya courses
The CIC regulated integrated courses for men and women combining Islamic and secular higher education.  Known as "Wafy" and "Wafiyya", these courses are currently offered in different modes such as Residential, Day-school and Distance.

Wafy 

Wafy is an eight-year programme in advanced Islamic studies (comprising two-year Higher Secondary, four-year Under Graduate and two-year Post Graduate courses) coupled with a recognized state university degree in a secular discipline. This course is offered in residential mode only and is exclusive for men.

The Post Graduate programme consists of six departments under three faculties namely Theology, Islamic Sharīʿah and Language and Culture.

Wafy Arts 
"Wafy Arts" is a five-year integrated programme comprising a two-year Higher Secondary and a three-year Under Graduate studies with a state university degree in a secular discipline coupled with a preparatory certificate and a degree in Islamic Studies offered by the C. I. C. This course is exclusive to men and is offered both in Residential and Day-school modes.

Wafiyya 
Wafiyya is a five-year course in Islamic studies (comprising two-year Higher Secondary and three-year Under Graduate courses) coupled with a recognized state university degree in a secular discipline. This course is offered in residential mode only and is exclusive for women.

An optional two-year Post Graduate programme is also on offer for Wafiyya under graduates, which they can complete either in Distance or Regular mode, subject to conditions.

Wafiyya Day 
"Wafiyya Day" is a five-year course in advanced Islamic studies (comprising two-year Higher Secondary and three-year Under Graduate courses) coupled with a recognized state university degree in a secular discipline. This course is offered in Day-School mode and is exclusive for women.

Student Life

Wafy Students Federation (WSF) 
Wafy Students Federation (WSF) is the student wing of CIC, representing all the students from 90 colleges owned by or affiliated to CIC.

The federation is actively involved in conducting various programmes and social projects. It coordinates curricular and non-curricular activities of the students from all affiliated colleges. Some of the focus areas of its operations include empowering the students, developing their organizational and leadership skills and leveraging their creative potential for various vital social projects.

The WSF, which has been operational for over 15 years, has already made its presence felt by conducting some tremendously successful state-level events such as the biannual State Wafy Arts Fests and an international seminar under the theme 'Multi culturalism and world peace' etc. It also organizes a variety of interesting programmes to enhance the skills of the students such as elocution and writing training camps and media workshops etc. Another important event is the state-wide Wafy sports meet which is held by WSF in every two years. The organization utilises an effective networking system called ‘Wafy Orbit system’ to reach out to the community.

Wafiyya Students Federation (WSF) 
Wafiyya Students Federation (WSF) is a state-wide association of students from Wafiyya institutions under the CIC. The organization, founded in 2011 and headquartered at Markazu Tharbiyyathil Islamiyya, Valanchery, has conducted a number of significant activities in the field of art and culture. The main purpose of the organisation is to consolidate and nurture the extracurricular activities of the students. To this end, the organization has held various state-level art fests and competitions.

Orbit 
Wafy orbit is an extensive, bottom-up networking system connecting Wafy and Wafiyya students across the state. With committees at Panchayat, Taluk, constituency and district levels, it helps the students reach out to the general public to disseminate CIC's message and conduct various community development programmes.

Wafy Arts Fest 
The State Wafy Arts Fests, a biannual state-level event, is one of the most prestigious and successful events organised by WSF. The 2015 edition of the event was co-located with an international seminar under the theme 'Multi culturalism and world peace'.

The 11th State Wafy Arts Fest was held at Mundayad indoor stadium, Kannur on January 20, 2019.

Wafiyya Arts Fest 
Wafiyya Arts Fest brings together talented students from all Wafiyy college to compete at a state-level event. The state-level event is preceded by various zonal arts fests.

The 7th State Wafiyya Arts Fest was held on February 9, 2019, at Markazu Tharbiyyathil Islamiyya Valanchery.

Wafy Sports Meet 
The WSF conducts an intercollege state-level sports meet, bringing together sporting talents from all Wafy colleges. The event is preceded by various college-level meets.

The Third State Wafy Sports Meet, held at the Calicut University Synthetic Track, was attended by around 1500 athletes in 31 events.

Workshops and Training Session

Leadership Conclave 
WSF has organized a Leadership Conclave under the theme 'Learn to Lead, Lead to Success'.  The conclave was aimed at providing organizational training for the union leaders from different colleges.

Beacon of Truth - Training Course 
WSF is planning to organize a 10-month training course on Islamic Faith Science titled 'Beacon of Truth'. This will enable the students to engage in fruitful dialogues with rationalists and respond to their queries and doubts.

Vagmeeyam - Speech Designing 
The Wafy Students Federation Fine Arts Committee conducts public speaking training sessions called “Vagmeeyam”. A series of workshops led by various trainers for selected students from Wafy colleges, “Vagmeeyam” aims to develop the public speaking skills of the students.

Attractions of CIC

Committed to Excellence 
To maintain excellent academic quality, the CIC has taken the following measures:

 While choosing faculty members it always seeks to synthesize experience and innovation, by achieving synergy between experienced teachers and innovative young blood.
 Instead of centralization at one campus and one locality, the CIC has its affiliated colleges spread across the length and breadth of the state of Kerala and outside Kerala.
 Students live under constant guidance and supervision of teachers so that they can take exclusive care of pupils’ education and upbringing.
 The academic programmes and extracurricular activities are designed with utmost care and accuracy.
 Understanding the importance of infrastructure facilities and good ambience in educational growth and mental health of the students, the CIC has made it mandatory for all affiliated colleges to set up quality infrastructure facilities at their campuses, making them compete to improve themselves and to get stars based on their performance in this regard. Women’s colleges under the CIC are requested to facilitate an exclusive campus taking into account their privacy requirements.

Women’s Colleges 
Women’s colleges affiliated to the CIC offer an excellent opportunity for girls to pursue a comprehensive academic programme combining Islamic and secular studies inside a safe and secured campus.  Apart from quality education and state-of-the-art academic and infrastructure facilities, these exclusive campuses for girls are tailored to provide them exceptional Islamic upbringing. In addition, special care is given for promoting their skills and personality and career developments.

Mentoring  
The CIC has put in place an effective mentoring system. Students are assisted by full-time mentors who provide them with customised psychological care and guidance.

The CIC conducts training and workshops for mentors. It also conducts inspections from time to time to ensure mentoring is done efficiently.

Facilities 

 Library: Extensive libraries with plenty of books, reference books, children's literature in Arabic, English, Malayalam and Urdu, extracts related to syllabus, commentaries and tools. (The number of books to be in the preparatory, degree and PG levels has been determined)
 Reading Room: Reading rooms with Malayalam, English, Arabic and Urdu newspapers, magazines, publications and other modern learning facilities.
 Auditorium and Smart Classroom: Auditoriums and smart classrooms with modern facilities for organizing public events, general classes, debates and training classes.

Co-curricular Activities 
Various educational and intellectual sessions and cultural programmes are organized at regular intervals and on official days such as Independence and Republic Days.  Eminent scholars, doctors, legal and political experts, writers, military officials and personality developers are invited to the colleges to interact with the students. The extracurricular activities in the colleges also include various programmes in Arabic, English, Urdu and Malayalam languages.

In addition, students are given special training in various presentation skills such as elocution, debates, seminars, table talks, discussions, mock parliaments etc. Moreover, there are magazines (both manuscript and printed), tabloids, bulletins, pamphlets, wall journals, souvenirs and research magazines to improve the writing skills of the students.

Compulsory Social Service Scheme  
The CIC accords top priority to inculcate in students the habit of voluntary services. It has made social service mandatory for all students, aimed at nurturing in them the habit of serving the society and working for the needy and the underprivileged in the society.

Students must complete 192 hours of social service during their degree (Aliya) period. They have to complete 24 hours in each of the eight semesters at Aliya level. Students will receive certificates after their works being reviewed by the guides of their respective institutions and the CIC's CSS Coordinator.

The CIC was the first Islamic institute to introduce compulsory social service as a part of its curriculum.    The first project was announced by the former Vice Chancellor of Calicut University K. K. N. Kurup at a meeting held at Shamsul Ulama Academy Wafy College, Vengapally, Wayanad on November 18, 2012.

The activities done by students under the CSS scheme include home building, flood volunteering, Mahal survey, Mahal empowerment, renovation of public libraries, cleaning work of government hospitals and local bodies, volunteering in programmes conducted by the Samastha Kerala Jam'iyyathul Ulama and its sub bodies, blood donation camps, medical camps, religious studies classes, Palliative care, Da'wa activities and relief activities. The Rescue Force formed by the Wafy Students' Federation during the Kerala flood have done some commendable jobs for two consecutive years. Over 400 students had worked in the 2019 flood alone.

Continuous Assessment   
In order to ensure the efficiency of the curriculum, the programmes are designed with various continuous evaluation activities such as continuous assessments, seminars, debates, collections, projects, symposiums, album setting, teaching practices, oral exams, essay writing, field works etc. The continuous assessment constitutes around 20 per cent of the total marks in some subjects.

Orientation & Workshops 
The CIC conducts orientation and workshops for students and parents to ensure the smooth running of the curriculum and to help them develop their personalities and strengthen their morale. The workshops include Da'wa workshops, field works, teaching practice sessions, pre and post marital counselling training, de-addiction counselling training, etc.

It also organizes workshops for teachers to provide them with developments in educational field and curriculum and to develop their personality and teaching skills. Workshops for the managements of colleges aim at making awareness on the role of effective management in the overall development of the educational process.

Academic Events 
The CIC conducts many academic events. Recently conducted International conferences and Fiqh seminars have received considerable media attention. Wafy and Wafiyya Alumni Associations and Students' Federations regularly conduct academic programmes and training workshops at regular intervals.

As part of the syllabus at the PG level, Wafy and Wafiyya students need to organize seminars and debates on different topics. The Examination Board is granting grace marks to those attending and presenting papers at national and international level academic events.

Madrasathul Umm  
"Madrasathul Umm" (which literally means ‘Mother’s School’) is an exclusive curriculum designed by the ClC to nurture the Arabic language skills of the students, placing more emphasis on Listening, Speaking, Reading and Writing (LSRW). This comprehensive course is tailored to provide students with the opportunity to learn Arabic as they learn the language from their mothers and get near-natural proficiency.With the help of trained teachers and modern techniques, Thamheediya students are enabled to learn in a creative and fun-filled environment by listening, speaking, reading and writing. The structure of the curriculum is designed by dividing the semesters in Thamheediya into two parts and dedicating one part to listening and speaking and the other to reading and writing.Students use audio-visual media for practicing listening skills; and organize discussions, and debates on relevant topics for training speaking skills. This is done with the help of teacher so that students will get a better idea of ​​the language and topics.

Exercise works in the Arabic grammar textbook (النحو الواضح) are divided into Simple(سهلة), Tough(صعبة) and Creative(إنشائية) in order to enhance quality and create more effective results. Simple works have to be done in classroom while others can be worked on in leisure time. Teachers who evaluate the works correct the mistakes and caution the students against repeating them. This will help the students to develop their writing skills.To improve reading skills, teachers instruct the students to read specific portions from children’s literature and to write summaries. They will present the summary in front of other students which will help them identify the errors in reading and cultivate the habit of serious reading. The curriculum is divided into four semesters and exams will be conducted in each semester. There are two types of tests being conducted. In the first type, students are shown specific video clips and are asked to answer video-based objective questions by marking on an OMR answer sheet. In the second type, students are asked to speak on selected topics so that the examiner can assess their skills and decide whether they meet the prescribed standards of the semester. In addition, students are also taught prescribed portions from literature and jurisprudence (Fiqh) and the term-end will assess their language proficiency as well the grasp of the subject.This comprehensive, cutting-edge and practice-oriented techniques create a vibrant environment for the student to thrive, excel and acquire near native proficiency in language.

Dissertation 
During the period of postgraduate courses, students are required to submit a dissertation in not less than 100 pages on a selected topic approved by the academic council of the CIC.  Later, they will be asked to defend and discuss their thesis in a viva voce in front of a select panel of experts from the faculty.

References

External links 
 Coordination of Islamic Colleges

Islam in Kerala
Higher education in India
Higher education authorities
Regulatory agencies of India
Islamic education in India
2000 establishments in Kerala
Universities and colleges in India